Serniawy  is a village in the administrative district of Gmina Sawin, within Chełm County, Lublin Voivodeship, in eastern Poland.

References

Villages in Chełm County